Nkolmetet is the name of one of the villages of the Beti tribe in the Nyong ang So'o division, in the center province of Cameroon.

Nkolmetet is a combined word of two different Beti words Nkol which means hill and the word Metet which is a kind of edible plant also called in Beti yolyolo. Because of it bitterness, the plant is commonly called in Cameroon Ndole of Ewondo and Duala language; also known as bitterleaf (Vernonia amygdalina).

Some 25 years ago the late prince Zang Zambo Salomon Dessalo, a wise man of the locality, predicted Nkolmetet will be a very big town. Today the village is a district en voie to be a subdivision.

Gallery

See also
Communes of Cameroon

Populated places in Centre Region (Cameroon)